Hunter Djali Yumunu Page-Lochard is an Australian stage and screen actor of both Aboriginal Australian and African-American descent. He is known for his roles in the films The Sapphires (2012), Around the Block (2013) and The Djarn Djarns (2005), and the 2016 TV series Cleverman.

Early life and education
Page-Lochard is the son of Stephen Page, who is from Brisbane, and Cynthia Lochard, who is from Manhattan. He was born in Sydney. His mother, who is of African-American descent, was a dancer for the New York City Ballet and is now a teacher for the Pilates Method. His father, who is descended from the Nunukul people and the Munaldjali of the Yugambeh people from southeast Queensland, was a dancer turned choreographer and became the artistic director for Bangarra Dance Theatre.

Page-Lochard attended St Mary's Cathedral College, Sydney.

In 2012, Page-Lochard graduated from Australian Film, Television and Radio School, receiving a certificate in screenwriting and completed an Actors Residency course at the National Institute of Dramatic Art.

Career

Stage
Page-Lochard first appeared on stage at six months old, held by his dad when he was dancing. He later appeared in Skin (2000); Boomerang (2005); Bloodland (2012, for the Sydney Theatre Company and Adelaide Festival by Bangarra Dance Theatre); and Blak (2013).

He featured in Wesley Enoch's, Black Diggers (2014) a Queensland Theatre Company production. He then played the lead in Brothers Wreck (2014) by Jada Alberts at Sydney's Belvoir directed by Leah Purcell. He played a role in ATYP's Sugarland (2014). He won the Sydney Theatre Awards' Best Newcomer Award for Black Diggers, Brothers Wreck and Sugarland. He was nominated for a Helpmann Award in 2015 for Brothers Wreck. In 2015, he starred as Orestes in Belvoir's Elektra/Orestes.

Film and TV
Page-Lochard made his feature film debut in Rachel Perkins' award-winning film, Bran Nue Dae (2010). He appeared in Wayne Blair's The Sapphires, which screened in Official Selection at the Cannes Film Festival. He also featured as the lead in Sarah Spillane's feature film, Around the Block (2013) alongside Christina Ricci, the film premiered at the Toronto International Film Festival in 2013. In 2015, he attended the Toronto International Film Festival for his father's feature film debut Spear (2015).

He has also featured in several short films, including Adrian Wills' Arcadia and Wayne Blair’s Black Talk and The Djarn Djarns (2005), which won the Crystal Bear Award for Best Short Film at the Berlin International Film Festival.

Page-Lochard has appeared in guest roles on Water Rats (2001), East West 101 (2007), directed by Peter Andrikidis and ABC2's Soul Mates (2014). He also appears as the lead in Wayne Blair and Leah Purcell's Genre series, ABC's Cleverman in 2016.

Advertising 
Page-Lochard stars in a 2022 Hyundai television ad, called "Have you tried it?",  which was filmed in the Flinders Ranges of South Australia.

Filmography

Theatre

References

External links
 
 

Living people
1993 births
21st-century Australian male actors
Australian actors of African descent
Australian male film actors
Australian male television actors
Australian people of American descent
Bundjalung people
Indigenous Australian male actors
Male actors from Sydney